Goose Creek is a city in Berkeley County in the U.S. state of South Carolina. The population was 45,946 at the 2020 census. Most of the Naval Weapons Station Charleston is in Goose Creek. As defined by the U.S. Office of Management and Budget, and used only by the U.S. Census Bureau and other federal agencies for statistical purposes, Goose Creek is included within the Charleston–North Charleston–Summerville metropolitan area and the Charleston–North Charleston Urbanized Area.

Geography

Goose Creek is located in southern Berkeley County at  (32.9955, -80.0289). It is bordered to the east by the Cooper River and the Back River, to the southeast by an outer portion of the city of Charleston, to the southwest by the city of Hanahan and (farther to the west) the city of North Charleston in Charleston County, and to the west by the unincorporated community of Ladson.

Demographics

2020 census

As of the 2020 United States census, there were 45,946 people, 13,924 households, and 10,341 families residing in the city.

2010 census
As of the census of 2010, there were 35,938 people, 8,947 households, and 7,443 families residing in the city. The population density was 921.6 people per square mile (355.9/km2). There were 9,482 housing units at an average density of 299.2 per square mile (115.5/km2). The racial makeup of the city was 78.50% White, 14.22% African American, 0.59% Native American, 2.66% Asian, 0.12% Pacific Islander, 1.56% from other races, and 2.36% from two or more races. Hispanic or Latino of any race were 4.05% of the population.

There were 8,947 households, out of which 49.7% had children under the age of 18 living with them, 68.9% were married couples living together, 10.6% had a female householder with no husband present, and 16.8% were non-families. 12.9% of all households were made up of individuals, and 2.9% had someone living alone who was 65 years of age or older. The average household size was 2.94 and the average family size was 3.22.

In the city, the distribution of the population by age was 29.6% under the age of 18, 18.2% from 18 to 24, 32.5% from 25 to 44, 15.4% from 45 to 64, and 4.3% who were 65 years of age or older. The median age was 26 years. For every 100 females, there were 115.7 males. For every 100 females age 18 and over, there were 120.3 males.

The median income for a household in the city was $45,919, and the median income for a family was $47,937. Males had a median income of $31,965 versus $23,754 for females. The per capita income for the city was $16,905. About 5.8% of families and 6.8% of the population were below the poverty line, including 8.0% of those under the age of 18 and 7.3% of those 65 and older.

History 
Although the city of Goose Creek was established in 1961, its history dates back many centuries. In the 1670s the Etiwan moved to the area to escape the Westo, seeking protection among the plantations of early colonists who were often referred to as the "Goose Creek men", mostly settled a few miles north of Charleston near a stream called Goose Creek, a tributary of the Cooper River. The Goose Creek men became leaders of the early Indian trade, and by the 1690s many held important offices in the colonial government. At first the Goose Creek men dealt mainly in Indian slaves, while later the deerskin trade dominated. Several colonial governors were Goose Creek men, such as James Moore and Robert Daniell. Other prominent men included brothers Daniel and Pierre Bacot.

The Otranto Plantation Indigo Vats and St. James Church are listed on the National Register of Historic Places.

Armed forces
Portions of the Charleston, South Carolina metropolitan area (Charleston, North Charleston, Goose Creek, and Hanahan) are home to branches of the United States military. During the Cold War, the Naval Base (1902–1996) became the third largest U.S. homeport serving over 80 ships and submarines. In addition, the Charleston Naval Shipyard repaired frigates, destroyers, cruisers, sub tenders, and submarines. The shipyard was also equipped for the refueling of nuclear subs.

During this period, the Weapons Station was the Atlantic Fleet's loadout base for all nuclear ballistic missile submarines. Two SSBN "Boomer" squadrons and a sub tender were homeported at the Weapons Station, while one SSN attack squadron, Submarine Squadron 4, and a sub tender were homeported at the Naval Base. At the 1996 closure of the Station's Polaris Missile Facility Atlantic (POMFLANT), over 2,500 nuclear warheads and their UGM-27 Polaris, UGM-73 Poseidon, and UGM-96 Trident I delivery missiles (SLBM) were stored and maintained, guarded by a U.S. Marine Corps security force company.

In 2010, the Air Force base (3,877 acres) and Naval Weapons Station (>17,000 acres) merged to form Joint Base Charleston.

Navy 
Naval Weapons Station, Joint Base Charleston (>17,000 acres, 27 square miles), Goose Creek and Hanahan
Naval Information Warfare Center Atlantic (NAVWAR) 
Naval Nuclear Power Training Command
Nuclear Power School
Nuclear Power Training Unit
Moored Training Nuclear Submarine, 
Moored Training Nuclear Submarine, 
Moored Training Nuclear Submarine, 2015 delivery
Moored Training Nuclear Submarine, After 2015 delivery
Naval Consolidated Brig, Charleston, East Coast
Mobile Mine Assembly Unit Eleven (MOMAU-11)
Naval Operations Support Center Charleston
Navy Reserve Center
Navy Munitions Command CONUS, Detachment Charleston
Explosive Ordnance Detachment
Naval Health Clinic Charleston
Navy Dental Clinic

Marines 
Marine Corps Reserve Center, Naval Weapons Station

Army 
South Carolina Army National Guard
Army Reserve Training Center
841st Army Transportation Battalion
1182nd Army Deployment & Distribution Support Battalion
1189th Army Transportation Brigade, Reserve Support Command
Army Strategic Logistics Activity

Police force
The Goose Creek Police Department is housed at the Marguerite H. Brown Municipal Center, along with the City Hall and Municipal Court, and is an active department within the community of Goose Creek. The Goose Creek Police Department is a CALEA accredited agency and works to maintain a good relationship with the citizens using the community policing method.

Education
There are three high schools that serve the Goose Creek area. Goose Creek High School and Stratford High School serve students inside Goose Creek, while Cane Bay High School is located outside Goose Creek city limits and serves students from both in and out of Goose Creek's city limits. Goose Creek High School is the home of the Berkeley County School of the Arts (BCA) Program.

Goose Creek has a public library, a branch of the Berkeley County Library System.

Notable people
 Madelyn Cline, actress
 Sean McPherson, South Dakota state legislator
 Brandon Shell, Offensive lineman, New York Jets and Seattle Seahawks
 Justin Smoak, Major League Baseball player
 Matt Wieters, Major League Baseball player
Joseph Young, orchestra conductor

See also 
 List of municipalities in South Carolina

References

External links

 
 

 
Populated places established in 1961
1961 establishments in South Carolina
Cities in South Carolina
Cities in Berkeley County, South Carolina
Cities in Charleston County, South Carolina
Charleston–North Charleston–Summerville metropolitan area